Dibenzylether is the organic compound with the formula (C6H5CH2)2O.  It is classified as an ether derived from benzyl alcohol.  A colorless, nearly odorless oil, the compound's main use is as a plasticizer.  It is prepared by treating benzyl chloride with base.

References

Aromatic solvents
Benzyl compounds